$3 may refer to:

 Cook Islands $3 banknote
 Cuban peso $3 coin or banknote

Obsolete denominations:

 Three-dollar piece (US, 1854–89)

See also 

 Fake denominations of United States currency
 Three Dollars (novel) by Elliot Perlman
 Three Dollars, film adaptation of the Perlman novel